Chocope is a town in Northern Peru, capital of the district of Chocope in the region La Libertad. This town is located beside the Pan-American Highway some 45 km north of Trujillo city in the agricultural Chicama Valley.

See also
Ascope Province
Chavimochic
Virú Valley
Virú
Moche valley

References

  
 

Populated places in La Libertad Region